is a Japanese female mixed martial artist and professional wrestler. She fought as a lightweight in the Deep and Jewels promotions before her retirement in 2014. Nagano has also wrestled in Ice Ribbon and World Wonder Ring Stardom. Her nickname is Future Princess.

Nagano won the 2009 Jewels Rough Stone Grand Prix at 54 kg.

Early life
She started wrestling in the fourth grade of elementary school and continued wrestling in middle school and high school, becoming second place in all of Japan at the high school level.

While studying at Chukyo Women's University, she was an amateur wrestling champion and finished fourth in the 55 kg division of the 2002 Japan Queen's Cup; the same tournament where future Olympic medalist Saori Yoshida finished first.

In 2004, she was ranked fourth in the 51 kg class, but left the university after three years before graduating and stopping wrestling.

Nagano moved to Tokyo in 2005, where she joined a modeling agency of independent wrestling and started talent activities. She was eventually charmed by MMA when she visited S-KEEP.

Mixed martial arts career

After winning her next fight by split decision and losing her third by decision, she went on to win her following three fights by submission (armbar). In the process, she won the 2009 Rough Stone Grand Prix 54 kg & under tournament after defeating Yoko Kagoshima in the tournament final.

Haga dominated the whole fight, earning a unanimous decision win. The loss was so devastating that Nagano was in tears even before the fight ended.

She was defeated by unanimous decision.

She was defeated by split decision.

She lost the fight by unanimous decision.

On , Nagano faced Anna Saito at Jewels 19th Ring in Osaka, Japan. She won the fight by submission due to an armbar in the first round.

Nagano's next fight took place on  when she faced Tomo Maesawa at Jewels 21st Ring. She defeated Maesawa by technical submission due to an armbar in the second round.

On , Nagano competed outside Japan for the first time when she faced Alexandra Chambers at Brace For War 17 in Australia. She was defeated by TKO early in the first round.

The fight was Tomita's retirement match. Nagano defeated Tomita by submission due to an armbar in the first round.

She won the fight by unanimous decision.

On , Nagano faced Takumi Umehara at Jewels 24th Ring. She defeated Umehara by submission due to a rear-naked choke in the first round.

She defeated Naito by submission due to an armbar in the first round.

She was defeated by unanimous decision. On December 28, 2013, Nagano announced that she was retiring from MMA the following February. However, on February 6, Nagano announced she was pregnant and would have to pull out of her exhibition match with Saori Ishioka. Nagano's retirement ceremony took place on February 16 at Deep Jewels 3.

Professional wrestling career
In January 2011, Nagano returned to professional wrestling, competing for the new World Wonder Ring Stardom promotion. She worked the promotion's first ever show on January 23, 2011, during which she defeated Eri Susa. However, after only a handful of appearances, which included her losing to Yoko Bito in a World of Stardom Championship tournament semifinal match on July 24, 2011, Nagano once again went inactive to concentrate on her career with Jewels. On April 2, 2013, Stardom announced that Nagano would be returning to take part in the promotion's big Ryōgoku Kokugikan event on April 29. In her return match at Ryōgoku Cinderella, Nagano teamed with Nanae Takahashi and Tsukasa Fujimoto in a six-woman tag team match, where they defeated Hiroyo Matsumoto, Kaori Yoneyama and Syuri.

Outside mixed martial arts
Nagano has posed in bikini and semi-nude photo shoots in Japanese magazine Friday.

Personal life
Nagano was married in December 2013 and announced her pregnancy on February 6, 2014.

Mixed martial arts record

|-
|Loss
|align=center|18–13–1
|Arisa Matsuda
|Decision (unanimous)
|Deep Jewels 39
|
|align=center| 2
|align=center| 5:00
|Tokyo, Japan
|
|-
| Win
| align=center|18–12–1
| Tomoko Inoue
| Submission (armbar)
| Deep Jewels 38
| 
| align=center|1
| align=center|4:19
| Tokyo, Japan
| 
|-
| Win
| align=center| 17–12–1
| Kate Oyama
| Submission (guillotine choke)
| Deep Jewels 37
| 
| align=center|2
| align=center|0:57
| Tokyo, Japan
|
|-
| Loss
| align=center| 16–12–1
| Miki Motono
| Decision (unanimous)
| Deep Jewels 24
| 
| align=center|2
| align=center|5:00
| Tokyo, Japan
|
|-
| Loss
| align=center| 16–11–1
| Miyuu Yamamoto
| Decision (unanimous)
| Rizin 14
| 
| align=center|3
| align=center|5:00
| Saitama, Japan
|
|-
| Draw
| align=center| 16–10–1
| Tanja Hoffmann
| Draw (majority)
| Deep Jewels 22
| 
| align=center|2
| align=center|5:00
| Tokyo, Japan 
|
|-
| Win
| align=center| 16–10
| Izumi Noguchi
| Submission (armbar)
| Deep Jewels 21
| 
| align=center|1
| align=center|4:02
| Tokyo, Japan 
|
|-
| Loss
| align=center| 15–10
| Bayarmaa Munkhgerel
| Decision (unanimous)
| MGL-1 Fighting Champion
| 
| align=center|3
| align=center| 5:00
| Ulaanbaatar, Mongolia
|
|-
| Win
| align=center| 15–9
| Sachiko Fujimori
| Technical Submission (armbar)
| Deep Jewels 13
| 
| align=center| 3
| align=center| 2:34
| Tokyo, Japan
| 
|-
| Loss
| align=center| 14–9
| Emi Tomimatsu
| Decision (unanimous)
| Deep Jewels 2
| 
| align=center| 2
| align=center| 5:00
| Kabukicho, Tokyo, Japan
| 
|-
| Win
| align=center| 14–8
| Akiko Naito
| Submission (armbar)
| Deep Jewels 1
| 
| align=center| 1
| align=center| 2:24
| Kabukicho, Tokyo, Japan
| 
|-
| Win
| align=center| 13–8
| Takumi Umehara
| Submission (rear-naked choke)
| Jewels 24th Ring
| 
| align=center| 1
| align=center| 1:42
| Kabukicho, Tokyo, Japan
| 
|-
| Win
| align=center| 12–8
| Emi Tomimatsu
| Decision (unanimous)
| Jewels 23rd Ring
| 
| align=center| 2
| align=center| 5:00
| Koto, Tokyo, Japan
| 
|-
| Win
| align=center| 11–8
| Rina Tomita
| Submission (armbar)
| Jewels 22nd Ring
| 
| align=center| 1
| align=center| 2:12
| Koto, Tokyo, Japan
| 
|-
| Loss
| align=center| 10–8
| Alexandra Chambers
| TKO (knee and punches)
| Brace For War 17: Brace Girls
| 
| align=center| 1
| align=center| 0:42
| Southport, Queensland, Australia
| 
|-
| Win
| align=center| 10–7
| Tomo Maesawa
| Technical Submission (armbar)
| Jewels 21st Ring
| 
| align=center| 2
| align=center| 3:37
| Koto, Tokyo, Japan
| 
|-
| Win
| align=center| 9–7
| Anna Saito
| Submission (armbar)
| Jewels 19th Ring
| 
| align=center| 1
| align=center| 1:50
| Taisho-ku, Osaka, Japan
| 
|-
| Loss
| align=center| 8–7
| Emi Fujino
| Decision (unanimous)
| Jewels 18th Ring
| 
| align=center| 2
| align=center| 5:00
| Koto, Tokyo, Japan
| 
|-
| Loss
| align=center| 8–6
| Mei Yamaguchi
| Decision (split)
| Jewels 17th Ring
| 
| align=center| 2
| align=center| 5:00
| Kabukicho, Tokyo, Japan
| 
|-
| Loss
| align=center| 8–5
| Megumi Fujii
| Decision (unanimous)
| Jewels 15th Ring
| 
| align=center| 2
| align=center| 5:00
| Kabukicho, Tokyo, Japan
| 
|-
| Win
| align=center| 8–4
| Emi Murata
| Submission (armbar)
| Jewels 13th Ring & 14th Ring
| 
| align=center| 1
| align=center| 1:40
| Koto, Tokyo, Japan
| 
|-
| Loss
| align=center| 7–4
| Seo Hee Ham
| Decision (split)
| Jewels 11th Ring
| 
| align=center| 2
| align=center| 5:00
| Bunkyo, Tokyo, Japan
| 
|-
| Win
| align=center| 7–3
| Celine Haga
| Submission (armbar)
| Jewels 9th Ring
| 
| align=center| 1
| align=center| 2:52
| Shinjuku, Tokyo, Japan
| 
|-
| Loss
| align=center| 6–3
| Celine Haga
| Decision (unanimous)
| Jewels 8th Ring
| 
| align=center| 2
| align=center| 5:00
| Koto, Tokyo, Japan
| 
|-
| Win
| align=center| 6–2
| Mai Ichii
| Decision (unanimous)
| Jewels 7th Ring
| 
| align=center| 2
| align=center| 5:00
| Shinjuku, Tokyo, Japan
| 
|-
| Win
| align=center| 5–2
| Yoko Kagoshima
| Submission (armbar)
| Jewels 6th Ring
| 
| align=center| 2
| align=center| 3:56
| Shinjuku, Tokyo, Japan
| 
|-
| Win
| align=center| 4–2
| Rina Tomita
| Technical Submission (armbar)
| Jewels 5th Ring
| 
| align=center| 1
| align=center| 2:25
| Shinjuku, Tokyo, Japan
| 
|-
| Win
| align=center| 3–2
| Rina Tomita
| Submission (armbar)
| Jewels 4th Ring
| 
| align=center| 2
| align=center| 0:35
| Koto, Tokyo, Japan
| 
|-
| Win
| align=center| 2–2
| Misaki Ozawa
| Submission (armbar)
| Jewels 3rd Ring
| 
| align=center| 1
| align=center| 2:09
| Shinjuku, Tokyo, Japan
| 
|-
| Loss
| align=center| 1–2
| Saori Ishioka
| Decision (unanimous)
| Jewels 1st Ring
| 
| align=center| 2
| align=center| 5:00
| Shinjuku, Tokyo, Japan
| 
|-
| Win
| align=center| 1–1
| Asami Kodera
| Decision (split)
| Smackgirl: World ReMix 2008 Second Round
| 
| align=center| 2
| align=center| 5:00
| Bunkyo, Tokyo, Japan
| 
|-
| Loss
| align=center| 0–1
| Megumi Fujii
| Submission (triangle choke)
| Smackgirl: Starting Over
| 
| align=center| 1
| align=center| 1:20
| Bunkyo, Tokyo, Japan
|

See also
List of female mixed martial artists

References

External links
 Mika Nagano Awakening Profile

Jewels profile 
Official blog 
Official blog (old) 

1983 births
Living people
Japanese female mixed martial artists
People from Gifu
Japanese female professional wrestlers
Lightweight mixed martial artists
Mixed martial artists utilizing wrestling